The Swedish Union for Performing Arts and Film, is a Swedish trade union and professional association for professional practitioners of authors, artists, technicians, administrators and students in theater and film. The union was formed in 1894 and was originally called the Swedish Theatre Union.  the chairman is Simon Norrthon.

References

Swedish Confederation of Professional Employees
Trade unions established in 1894
Trade unions in Sweden